Tarasivka may refer to several places in Ukraine:

Cherkasy Oblast
Tarasivka, Chornobai Raion, a village in Chornobai Raion
Tarasivka, Monastyrysche Raion, a village in Monastyrysche Raion
Tarasivka, Zvenyhorodka Raion, a village in Zvenyhorodka Raion

Chernihiv Oblast
Tarasivka, Ichnia Raion, a village in Ichnia Raion
Tarasivka, Korop Raion, a village in Korop Raion
Tarasivka, Pryluky Raion, a village in Pryluky Raion

Crimea
Tarasivka, Dzhankoi Raion, a village in Dzhankoi Raion
Tarasivka, Nyzhnohirskyi Raion, a village in Nyzhnohirskyi Raion

Dnipropetrovsk Oblast
Tarasivka, Krynychky Raion, a village in Krynychky Raion
Tarasivka (Pochyno-Sofiyivka), Mahdalynivka Raion, a village in Pochyno-Sofiivka silrada, Mahdalynivka Raion
Tarasivka (Shevcenkivka), Mahdalynivka Raion, a village in Shevcenkivka silrada, Mahdalynivka Raion
Tarasivka (Topchyne), Mahdalynivka Raion, a village in Topchyne silrada, Mahdalynivka Raion
Tarasivka, Mezhova Raion, a village in Mezhova Raion
Tarasivka, Sofiyivka Raion, a village in Sofiivka Raion
Tarasivka, Tomakivka Raion, a village in Tomakivka Raion
Tarasivka, Tsarychanka Raion, a village in Tsarychanka Raion
Tarasivka, Verkhnodniprovsk Raion, a village in Verkhnodniprovsk Raion

Donetsk Oblast
Tarasivka, Kostiantynivka Raion, a village in Kostiantynivka Raion
Tarasivka, Volnovakha Raion, a village in Volnovakha Raion

Ivano-Frankivsk Oblast
Tarasivka, Ivano-Frankivsk Oblast, a village in Tlumach Raion

Kharkiv Oblast
Tarasivka, Kharkiv Oblast, a village in Sakhnovshchyna Raion

Kherson Oblast
Tarasivka, Oleshky Raion, a village in Oleshky Raion
Tarasivka, Skadovsk Raion, a village in Skadovsk Raion

Khmelnytskyi Oblast
Tarasivka, Horodok Raion, a village in Horodok Raion
Tarasivka, Iziaslav Raion, a village in Iziaslav Raion
Tarasivka, Kamianets-Podilskyi Raion, a village in Kamianets-Podilskyi Raion
Tarasivka, Yarmolyntsi Raion, a village in Yarmolyntsi Raion

Kyiv Oblast
Tarasivka, Bila Tserkva Raion, a village in Bila Tserkva Raion
Tarasivka, Boryspil Raion, a village in Boryspil Raion
Tarasivka, Brovary Raion, a village in Brovary Raion
Tarasivka, Fastiv Raion, a village in Fastiv Raion
Tarasivka, Kaharlyk Raion, a village in Kaharlyk Raion
Tarasivka, Kyiv-Sviatoshyn Raion, a village in Kyiv-Sviatoshyn Raion
Tarasivka, Myronivka Raion, a village in Myronivka Raion
Tarasivka, Obukhiv Raion, a village in Obukhiv Raion
Tarasivka, Pereiaslav-Khmelnytskyi Raion, a village in Pereiaslav-Khmelnytskyi Raion
Tarasivka, Skvyra Raion, a village in Skvyra Raion
Tarasivka, Tetiiv Raion, a village in Tetiiv Raion
Tarasivka, Volodarka Raion, a village in Volodarka Raion

Kirovohrad Oblast
Tarasivka, Bobrynets Raion, a village in Bobrynets Raion
Tarasivka, Mala Vyska Raion, a village in Mala Vyska Raion
Tarasivka, Novhorodka Raion, a village in Novhorodka Raion
Tarasivka, Novoarkhanhelsk Raion, a village in Novoarkhanhelsk Raion
Tarasivka, Oleksandriia Raion, a village in Oleksandriia Raion
Tarasivka, Oleksandrivka Raion, a village in Oleksandrivka Raion

Luhansk Oblast
Tarasivka, Luhansk Oblast, a village in Troitske Raion

Lviv Oblast
Tarasivka, Lviv Oblast, a village in Pustomyty Raion

Mykolaiv Oblast
Tarasivka, Bashtanka Raion, a village in Bashtanka Raion
Tarasivka, Kazanka Raion, a village in Kazanka Raion
Tarasivka, Pervomaisk Raion, a village in Pervomaisk Raion
Tarasivka, Vradiivka Raion, a village in Vradiivka Raion

Odessa Oblast
Tarasivka, Odessa Oblast, a village in Ivanivka Raion

Poltava Oblast
Tarasivka, Hrebinka Raion, a village in Hrebinka Raion
Tarasivka, Karlivka Raion, a village in Karlivka Raion
Tarasivka, Khorol Raion, a village in Khorol Raion
Tarasivka, Orzhytsia Raion, a village in Orzhytsia Raion
Tarasivka, Semenivka Raion, a village in Semenivka Raion
Tarasivka, Zinkiv Raion, a village in Zinkiv Raion

Sumy Oblast
Tarasivka, Krolevets Raion, a village in Krolevets Raion
Tarasivka, Velyka Pysarivka Raion, a village in Velyka Pysarivka Raion

Ternopil Oblast
Tarasivka, Ternopil Oblast, a village in Zbarazh Raion

Vinnytsia Oblast
Tarasivka, Chechelnyk Raion, a village in Chechelnyk Raion
Tarasivka, Haisyn Raion, a village in Haisyn Raion
Tarasivka, Kalynivka Raion, a village in Kalynivka Raion
Tarasivka, Mohyliv-Podilskyi, a village in Mohyliv-Podilskyi
Tarasivka (Lopatynka), Orativ Raion, a village in Pochyno-Sofiyivka selsoviet, Orativ Raion
Tarasivka (Pidvysoke), Orativ Raion, a village in Shevcenkivka selsoviet, Orativ Raion
Tarasivka, Tulchyn Raion, a village in Tulchyn Raion
Tarasivka, Zhmerynka Raion, a village in Zhmerynka Raion

Zakarpattia Oblast
Tarasivka, Zakarpattia Oblast, a village in Tiachiv Raion

Zaporizhia Oblast
Tarasivka, Chernihivka Raion, a village in Chernihivka Raion
Tarasivka, Orikhiv Raion, a village in Orikhiv Raion
Tarasivka, Polohy Raion, a village in Polohy Raion

Zhytomyr Oblast
Tarasivka, Andrushivka Raion, a village in Andrushivka Raion
Tarasivka, Malyn Raion, a village in Malyn Raion
Tarasivka, Zhytomyr Raion, a village in Zhytomyr Raion